Jamie Coyne (born 2 January 1982) is an Australian football (soccer) player. He is the younger brother of Chris Coyne and son of former NSL player John Coyne.

Club career

Early career
Jamie was signed by West Ham United as his first professional football contract. From there, Jamie returned to Australia to play for Perth SC, where he was voted the fairest and best player for the league. Jamie was then signed by Perth Glory as part of their national soccer league team where he played for two seasons while they won the league championship and were also grand final winners. After standing out for Perth Glory he signed a 3-year contract with ADO Den Haag in the Dutch Eredivisie.

Perth Glory
Jamie decided to return to Perth Glory for the second time in his career for the start of the new Hyundai A League competition, where he would remain for the next six years of his career. During this time he was the team captain and was also selected for the Australian national team training camps.

Jamie was a part of the Perth Glory team that made the finals for the first time in the clubs A-League history, during the 2009/10 season. However, the team bowed out to the Wellington Phoenix on penalties. He has played over 150 games for the club.

Sydney FC
After several seasons in Perth, Coyne was offered a one-year contract with Sydney FC. Known for his physical presence, pace and commitment he was seen as an important signing in renewing their backline. His first goal came in his third match for the club against Adelaide United F.C. Jamie asked for a release from his contract so that he could sign for Sriwajaya FC in the Indonesian Super League for the second half of the season.

Sriwijaya
He made an immediate impact with his new club when they didn't concede a goal in his first 6 games, the team went on to win the league title with 4 games remaining in the season.

Melbourne Heart
Coyne returned to Australia and on 6 February 2013 joined A-League side Melbourne Heart until the end of the season.

Honours

Club honours
Perth SC
Football West State League Premier Division (1): 2002

Perth Glory
National Soccer League (2): 2002–03, 2003–04

Sriwijaya
Indonesia Super League (1): 2011–12

Bayswater City SC
National Premier Leagues Western Australia (1): 2014

Club career statistics 
(Correct as of 5 July 2012)

References

External links
 Perth Glory profile
 Oz Football profile
 Pint Culture profile
 Melbourne Heart profile

1981 births
Living people
Soccer players from Sydney
Australian people of Irish descent
Australian expatriate soccer players
Association football fullbacks
West Ham United F.C. players
Perth Glory FC players
ADO Den Haag players
A-League Men players
National Soccer League (Australia) players
Liga 1 (Indonesia) players
Sriwijaya F.C. players
Australian expatriate sportspeople in Indonesia
Sydney FC players
Melbourne City FC players
Indonesian Super League-winning players
Australian soccer players
Australian people of English descent
Australian expatriate sportspeople in the Netherlands
Expatriate footballers in the Netherlands
Expatriate footballers in Indonesia
Eredivisie players
Bayswater City SC players
Perth SC players